Francis Thomas Aiken (13 February 1898 – 18 May 1983) was an Irish revolutionary and politician. He was chief of staff of the Anti-Treaty IRA at the end of the Irish Civil War. Aiken later served as Tánaiste from 1965 to 1969 and Minister for External Affairs from 1951 to 1954 and 1957 to 1969. Previously he had held the posts of Minister for Finance from 1945 to 1948, Minister for the Co-ordination of Defensive Measures 1939 to 1945, Minister for Defence from 1932 to 1939, and was also Minister for Lands and Fisheries from June–November 1936.

He was a Teachta Dála (TD) for the Louth constituency from 1923 to 1973, making him the second longest-serving member of Dáil Éireann and the longest-serving cabinet minister. Originally a member of Sinn Féin, he was later a founding member of Fianna Fáil.

Early life

Early years
Frank Aiken was born on 13 February 1898 at Carrickbracken, Camlough, County Armagh, Ireland, the seventh and youngest child of James Aiken, a builder from County Tyrone, and Mary McGeeney of Corromannon, Beleek, County Armagh. James Aiken built Catholic churches in South Armagh. Aiken was a nationalist, a member of the IRB and a county councillor, who refused an offer to stand as an MP. James was Chairman of the Local Board of the Poor Guardians. In 1900, on her visit to Ireland, he told Queen Victoria that he would not welcome her "until Ireland has become free".

Frank Aiken was educated at the Camlough National School and in Newry by Irish Christian Brothers at Abbey Christian Brothers Grammar School,  although he had only a 'vague' recollection of school.

Revolutionary period

Irish Volunteers and IRA
He was elected a lieutenant in 1914 when he joined the Camlough Company of Irish Volunteers and the Gaelic League. But the northern nationalists split so they took no part in the Easter Rising. He became secretary of the local branch in 1917 and joined Sinn Féin. His sister Nano Aiken organised Cumann na mBan in Newry, setting up a local branch at Camlough. While working at the Co-Operative Flax-Scutching Society, Aiken committed to speaking Irish, which he learned at the Donegal Gaeltacht and Omeath Irish College.

He first met Éamon de Valera at the East Clare election in June 1917, riding despatches for Austin Stack. During a rowdy by-election at Bessbrook in February 1918, Aiken was elected a captain of Volunteers, stewarding electioneering. As secretary and chairman of the South Armagh district executive (comhairle ceanntair) it was his job to be chief fund-raiser for the Dublin Executive, responsible for the Dáil loan masterminded by Michael Collins. 

In 1917, making an outward display of defiance, Aiken raised the republican Irish tricolor, opposite Camlough Barracks in Armagh, a move designed as deliberate provocation.

In March 1918  he was arrested by the RIC for illegal drilling — an act of open defiance that provoked a sentence of imprisonment for one month. On release that summer he joined the secretive Irish Republican Brotherhood fighting Hibernianism in the area. By 1919 Aiken's clandestine activities mainly consisted of arms raids on dumps of the Ulster Volunteers who had imported weapons to resist Home Rule in 1913–14. As well as UVF dumps, Aiken and the Newry Brigade also raided prominent local unionist barracks at Dromilly, Ballyedmond Castle and Loughall Manor. Although they failed to capture many weapons  the raids gave experience to newly recruited Volunteers. Aiken was also responsible for setting up GAA Club, Gaelic League branch, a Cumann na mBan Camogie League. Within a few years he was Chairman of Sinn Féin in Armagh, and was also elected to Armagh County Council.

War of Independence
Operating from the south Armagh/north Louth area, Aiken's unit was one of the most effective IRA in Ulster during the Irish War of Independence. This success is attributed primarily to Aiken's leadership and training methods.

In May 1920, he led 200 IRA men in an assault on the RIC barracks in Newtownhamilton, attacking the building and then burning it with paraffin spayed from a potato sprayer; however, the garrison did not surrender. Aiken himself led a squad which blasted a hole in the wall of the barracks with gelignite and entered through it, exchanging shots with the policemen inside.

At a sports event in Cullyhanna in June 1920, Aiken led a group of three men that demanded that three RIC men hand over their weapons. Shooting broke out and one man on each side was killed.

In July, he was almost killed at Banbridge. While riding a motorcycle to Lurgan he was chased by an angry mob.

In December 1920, he led another assault, this time abortive, on the RIC station in his home village of Camlough. In reprisal, the newly formed Ulster Special Constabulary burned Aiken's home and those of ten of his relatives in the Camlough area. They also arrested and killed two local republicans. From this point onward, the conflict in the area took on an increasingly bitter and sectarian quality. Aiken tried on a number of occasions to ambush USC patrols from the ruins of his family home.

In April 1921, Aiken's men mounted an operation in Creggan, County Armagh to ambush the police and Special Constabulary. One Special constable was killed in the ensuing firefight. Some accounts have reported that Aiken took the Protestant Church congregation in the village hostage to lure the Specials out onto the road. However, Mathew Lewis states that both Catholic and Protestant churchgoers were held in a pub to prevent their getting caught in the crossfire. Nevertheless, sectarian bitterness deepened in the area. The following month, the Special Constabulary started shooting Catholic civilians in revenge for IRA attacks.

In June 1921, Aiken organised his most successful attack yet on the British military, when his men derailed a British troop train heading from Belfast to Dublin, killing the train guard, three cavalry soldiers and 63 horses. Shortly afterwards, the Specials took four Catholics from their homes in Bessbrook and Altnaveigh, shooting them dead.

After an IRA reorganisation in April 1921, Aiken was put in command of the Fourth Northern Division of the IRA. The cycle of violence in south-east Ulster area continued the following year, despite a formal truce with the British from 11 July 1921. Michael Collins organised a clandestine guerrilla offensive against the newly created Northern Ireland State. In May 1922, for reasons that have never been properly determined, Aiken and his Fourth Northern Division never took part in the operation, although it was planned that they would.

Aiken remained Head of the Ulster Council Command, however. He was quickly promoted through the ranks, rising to commandant of Newry Brigade and eventually commander of 4th Northern Division from spring 1921. The IRA units he would eventually command extended from County Louth, southern and western County Down, and from March 1921 the whole of County Armagh.

None the less, the local IRA's inaction at this time did not end the bloodshed in South Armagh. Aiken has been accused by unionists of ethnic cleansing of Protestants from parts of South Armagh, Newry and other areas of the north. In particular, Aiken's critics cite the killing of six Protestant civilians, on an incident called the Altnaveigh Massacre, on 17 June 1922. The attack was in reprisal for the Special Constabulary's killing of two nationalists near Camlough on 13 June and a sexual assault on Una McGuill, the wife of one of Aiken's friends, James McGuill.   As well as the six civilians, two Special Constables were killed in an ambush, and two weeks later a unionist politician, William Frazer, was abducted, killed and his body secretly buried. It was not found until 1924.

Civil War
After the IRA split over the Anglo-Irish Treaty in 1922, Aiken ultimately became aligned with the anti-Treaty side in spite of personal efforts to prevent division and civil war and by remaining neutral at first. After fighting broke out between pro- and anti-Treaty units in Dublin on 28 June 1922, he wrote to Richard Mulcahy on 6 July 1922 calling for a truce, the election of a new reunited IRA army council and the removal of the Oath of Allegiance from the Free State constitution. Mulcahy was evasive, however, and said he 'could not see a way to advise the government' to agree with Aiken's proposals. Subsequently, Aiken travelled to Limerick meet with anti-Treaty IRA leader Liam Lynch, and urged him to consider a truce in return for the removal of references to the British monarch from the constitution. Aiken later felt that without the sterling work done in support of the Treaty by Eoin O'Duffy, aided by Mulcahy and Eoin MacNeill, civil war would have been avoided.

Despite his neutrality and pleas for a negotiated end to the Civil War, Aiken was arrested by pro-Treaty troops on 16 July 1922, under Dan Hogan and imprisoned at Dundalk Gaol along with about 200 to 300 of his men. After just ten days imprisonment, he was freed in a mass escape of 100 men from Dundalk prison on 28 July. Then, on 14 August, he led a surprise attack of between 300 and 400 anti-treaty IRA men on Dundalk. They blew holes in the army barracks there and rapidly took control of the town at a cost of just two of his men killed. The operation freed 240 republican prisoners seizing 400 rifles.  While in possession of the town, Aiken publicly called for an end to the civil war. For the remainder of the conflict he remained at large with his unit, carrying out no major attacks on Free State forces. Aiken was to remain unenthusiastic about the internecine struggle.

Chief of Staff
Aiken was with IRA leader Liam Lynch's patrol when they were ambushed at Knockmealdown on 10 April 1923. Lynch was shot and killed. Aiken rescued crucial IRA papers, "saved and brought through at any cost". His succeeded Lynch as IRA Chief of Staff on 20 April. Always ambivalent about the war against the Free State, Aiken soon issued a letter ordering a suspension of offensive operations from 30 April.Department of the Chief of Staff, General Headquarters, Dublin, April 27th, 1923.

Special Army Orders. To OCs, Commanders and Independent Brigades.

Suspension of Offensive

1. I order to give effect to the decision of the government and Army Council embodied in attached Proclamation of this date. You will arrange the suspension of all offensive operations in your area as from now, Monday April 30th.

2. You will ensure that while remaining on the offensive all units take adequate measures to protect themselves and their munitions.

Chief of Staff.

Aiken had remained close to Éamon de Valera, who had long wanted to end the Civil War, and together the two came up with a compromise that would save the anti-Treaty side from a formal surrender. Instead of giving up their weapons, their fighters would receive a further order to 'dump arms' and simply return home as honourable republicans. Aiken wrote: "We took up arms to free our country and we'll keep them until we see an honourable way or reaching our objective without arms".

The ceasefire and dump-arms order, issued on 24 May 1923, effectively ended the Irish Civil War, though the Free State government did not issue a general amnesty until the following year. Aiken remained IRA Chief of Staff until 12 November 1925. That summer the IRA sent a delegation led by Pa Murray to the Soviet Union for a personal meeting with Joseph Stalin, in the hope of gaining Soviet finance and weaponry assistance. A secret pact was agreed whereby the IRA would spy on the United States and the United Kingdom, and pass information to Red Army military intelligence in New York City and London in return for £500 a month. The pact was originally approved by Aiken, who left his position as chief of staff soon after.  He was succeeded by Andrew Cooney and Moss Twomey, who kept up the secret espionage relationship.

Founder of Fianna Fáil and government minister
Aiken was at the April 1925 Commemoration ceremony at Dundalk, but by March 1926—when De Valera founded a new party, Fianna Fáil—he was in America. Aiken was first elected to Dáil Éireann as a Sinn Féin candidate for Louth in 1923; in June 1927 he was re-elected there for Fianna Fáil, continuing to be re-elected for that party at every election until his retirement from politics fifty years later. He entered the first Fianna Fáil government as Minister for Defence, later becoming Minister for the Co-ordination of Defensive Measures with responsibility for overseeing Ireland's national defence and neutral position during the Second World War (see The Emergency). In May 1926 he bought Dun Gaoithe, a dairy farm, at Sandyford, County Dublin. Aiken was an innovative, creative individual, an amateur inventor, taking out patents for a turf stove, a beehive, an air shelter, an electric cooker and a spring heel for a shoe.

Clash with the Governor General

Aiken became a source of controversy in mid-1932 when he, along with Vice-President of the Executive Council Seán T. O'Kelly, publicly snubbed the Governor-General of the Irish Free State, James McNeill, by staging a public walkout at a function in the French legation in Dublin. McNeill privately wrote to Éamon de Valera, the President of the Executive Council, to complain at what media reports called the "boorishness" of Aiken and O'Kelly's behaviour. While agreeing that the situation was "regrettable" de Valera, instead of chastising the ministers, suggested that the Governor-General inform the Executive Council of his social engagements to enable ministers to avoid ones he was attending. Aiken had in March 1932 been trying to reach a new rapprochement, and "reconciled the Army to the new regime". On 9 March he visited republican prisoners in Arbour Hill prison; they were released the next day. – Aiken was given a vice-presidency, 'Agriculture', by James Ryan at the Ottawa Conference. He advised on the usage of cutting peat bogs in County Meath and visited the Curragh Camp to accelerate land distribution to poor tenantry. Land was released in the 'Midlands' for development.

When McNeill took offence at de Valera's response and, against government advice, published his correspondence, De Valera formally advised King George V to dismiss the Governor General. The King arranged a special deal between both men, whereby McNeill would retire from his post a few weeks earlier than planned, with the resignation coinciding with the dates de Valera had suggested for the dismissal. On 25 April 1938, Aiken was too closely associated with the IRA to be allowed into the Anglo-Irish Agreement negotiations. Although the governor-generalship of the Irish Free State was controversial, the media and even anti-governor-generalship politicians in the opposition Labour Party publicly, and even members of de Valera's cabinet privately, criticised Aiken and O'Kelly for their treatment of McNeill, whom all sides saw as a decent and honourable man. In later life Aiken refused to discuss the affair.

Minister for the Coordination of Defensive Measures and World War II
At the outbreak of war, Aiken was appointed to this post by de Valera. He gained notoriety in liberal Dublin circles for overseeing censorship: his clashes with R. M. Smyllie, editor of The Irish Times, ensured this censorious attitude was resented by many. Aiken not only corrected war coverage by the Irish Times, whose editorial line was largely pro-British, but also banned pro-allied war films and even forbade the reporting of parliamentarians' speeches that went against the government line of strict neutrality. Aiken justified these measures, citing the 'terrible and all prevailing force of modern warfare' and the importance therein of morale and propaganda.

Aiken remained opposed to a British role and partition in Ireland, and was therefore a strong supporter of de Valera's policy of Irish neutrality that denied Britain use of Irish ports during the Battle of the Atlantic. Aiken considered that Ireland had to stand ready to resist invasion by both Germany and Britain. The Irish Army was therefore greatly expanded under Aiken's ministry. It increased to a strength of 41,000 regulars and 180,000 in auxiliary units – the Local Defence Force and Local Security Force – by 1941, although these formations were relatively poorly equipped.

Aiken wanted to incorporate the IRA into the Army and offered the former an amnesty in the spring of 1940, which the underground organisation turned down. Nevertheless, during wartime as the IRA cooperated with German intelligence and pressed for a German landing in Northern Ireland, the government, with Aiken's approval, interned several hundred of its members and executed six for the shooting of Irish police officers. Even so, Aiken remained somewhat sympathetic to them in private and visited their prisoners in Arbour Hill prison in Dublin. However, he did not appeal for clemency for those condemned to death.

Thinking that Britain would lose the war in 1940, he refused to back senior British civil servant Malcolm MacDonald's plan for the unification of Ireland in return for the Irish state joining the British effort. In diplomatic negotiations Aiken told him that a united Ireland, if it was conceded, would still stay neutral to safeguard its security and that further talks were 'a sheer waste of time'. Furthermore, the Irish people 'would not support their government taking them into the war without some actual provocation from Germany'. When asked on American radio about the offer of unity in return for entering the war, he replied, 'most certainly not. We want union and sovereignty, not union and slavery'.

In March 1941, Aiken was sent to America to secure US supplies, both military and economic, that DeValera claimed Britain was withholding owing to Irish neutrality. Aiken had a bad-tempered meeting with President Franklin Roosevelt in Washington DC. Roosevelt urged Aiken and Ireland to join the war on the allied side asking if it was true that he had said that 'Ireland had nothing to fear from a German victory'. Aiken denied saying this but cited the British 'supply squeeze' as an act of aggression and asked the US to help. Roosevelt agreed to send supplies, but only if Britain consented.  At the close Aiken asked the President to 'support us in our stand against aggression'. 'German aggression, yes' Roosevelt replied, to which Aiken retorted 'British aggression too'. This infuriated Roosevelt, who shouted 'nonsense' and 'pulled the tablecloth [from under his lunch] sending cutlery flying around the room'. Ultimately, Aiken was not able to secure a promise of American arms, but was able to get a shipment of grain, two merchant ships and coal. Roosevelt also gave 'his personal guarantee' that Britain would not invade Ireland.

Minister for External Affairs

Aiken was Minister for Finance for three years following the war and was involved in economic post–war development in the industrial, agricultural, educational and other spheres. However, it was during his two periods as Minister for External Affairs—1951 to 1954, and 1957 to 1969—that Aiken fulfilled his enormous political potential. As Foreign Minister he adopted where possible an independent stance for Ireland at the United Nations and other international forums such as the Council of Europe. Despite a great deal of opposition, both at home and abroad, he stubbornly asserted the right of smaller UN member countries to discuss the representation of communist China at the General Assembly. Unable to bring the issue of the partition of Ireland to the UN, because of Britain's veto on the Security Council and unwillingness of other Western nations to interfere in what they saw as British affairs at that time (the US taking a more ambiguous position), Aiken ensured that Ireland vigorously defended the rights of small nations such as Tibet and Hungary, nations whose problems he felt Ireland could identify with and had a moral obligation to help.

Aiken also supported the right of countries such as Algeria to self-determination and spoke out against apartheid in South Africa. Under Ireland's policy of promoting the primacy of international law and reducing global tension at the height of the Cold War, Aiken promoted the idea of "areas of law", which he believed would free the most tense regions around the world from the threat of nuclear war.

The 'Aiken Plan' was introduced at the United Nations in an effort to combine disarmament and peace in the Middle East, Ireland a country being on good terms with both Israel and many Arab countries. In the UN the Irish delegation sat between Iraq and Israel forming a kind of physical 'buffer': in Aiken's time (who as a minister spent a lot of time with the UN delegation) both the Italians (who on their turn sat in the vicinity of the Iraqi delegation), the Irish and the Israelis claimed to be the one and only UN delegation of New York, a city inhabited by many Irish, Jewish and Italians.  Aiken was also a champion of nuclear non-proliferation, for which he received the honour of being the first minister to sign the Treaty on the Non-Proliferation of Nuclear Weapons in 1968 at Moscow.  Aiken's impact as Minister for External Affairs was such that he is sometimes referred to as the father of Irish foreign policy.  His performance was praised in particular by a later Minister for Foreign Affairs, Fine Gael's Garret FitzGerald.

Later years
Aiken retired from Ministerial office and as Tánaiste in 1969. During the Arms Crisis it is said that the Taoiseach, Jack Lynch, turned to Aiken for advice on a number of issues. Aiken retired from politics in 1973 due to the fact that Charles Haughey, whose style of politics Aiken strongly disliked, was allowed to run as a Fianna Fáil candidate in the 1973 general election. Initially he planned to announce the reason for his decision, but under pressure finally agreed to announce that he was retiring on medical advice.

Refusal of candidacy for the presidency of Ireland
After his retirement, the outgoing President of Ireland Éamon de Valera, sought to convince Aiken—one of his closest friends—to run for Fianna Fáil in the 1973 presidential election. However, Aiken refused all requests to run and the party finally selected Erskine H. Childers to be its candidate. Childers won the election.

Clash with Ernest Blythe
Shortly before his death, former Cumann na nGaedheal minister Ernest Blythe accused Aiken of rudely snubbing him in public throughout his political career. He said that, because of his support for the Treaty, Aiken would pointedly turn his back on him whenever they came into contact. This continuing bitterness towards Blythe was in contrast with the cross-party friendship which had developed between their colleagues Seán MacEntee (anti-treaty) and Desmond FitzGerald (pro-treaty) who, after the divide, re-established relationships and ensured their children held no civil war bitterness. The great rivals Éamon de Valera and W. T. Cosgrave, after years of enmity, also became slightly reconciled in the late 1950s.

Family
In 1934 Aiken married Maud Davin, the director of the Dublin Municipal School of Music. The couple had three children: Aedamar, Proinnsias and Lochlann.

Death

Frank Aiken died on 18 May 1983 in Dublin from natural causes at the age of 85. He was buried in his native Camlough, County Armagh, Northern Ireland.

Honours and memorials
Aiken received many decorations and honours, including honorary doctorates from the National University of Ireland and University College Dublin. He received the Grand Cross of St. Olav, the highest honour Norway can give to a foreigner, during a state visit to Norway in 1964. He was also a lifelong supporter of the Irish language. His son, also named Frank, ran unsuccessfully in the 1987 and 1989 general elections for the Progressive Democrats. His wife died in a road accident in 1978.

Aiken Barracks in Dundalk, County Louth, now the headquarters of the 27 Infantry Battalion is named in his honour.

References

Bibliography
 Kelly, Dr. S & Evans, B, (eds.) Frank Aiken: Nationalist and Internationalist (Irish Academic Press, 2014)
 Bowman, J, De Valera and the Ulster Question 1917-1973 (Oxford 1982)
 Campbell, Colm, Emergency Law in England 1918-1925 (Oxford 1994)
 Cronin, S, The Ideology of the IRA (Ann Arbor 1972)
 Harnden, Toby, Bandit Country the IRA and South Armagh, Hodder & Staughton, (London 1999)
 Hart, P, The IRA at war 1916-1923 (London 2003)
 Henry, R.M, The Evolution of Sinn Fein (Dublin and London, 1920)
 Hepburn, A.C, Catholic Belfast and Nationalist Ireland in the era of Joe Devlin 1871-1934 (Oxford 2008)
 Hopkinson, Michael, The Irish War of Independence (Dublin and Montreal 2002).
 Lewis, Matthew, Frank Aiken's War, The Irish Revolution 1916–1923, UCD Press (Dublin 2014)
 Ni Dhonnchadha, Máirín and Dorgan, Theo (eds), Revising the Rising(Derry 1991).
 McCartan, Patrick, With de Valera in America (New York 1932)
 McDermott, J, Northern Divisions: The Old IRA and the Belfast Pogroms, 1920-22 (Belfast 2001)
 Phoenix, E, Northern Nationalism:  Nationalist Politics, Partition and the Catholic minority in Northern Ireland 1890-1941 (Belfast 1994)
 Skinnider, Margaret, Doing My Bit For Ireland (New York 1917).

Further reading
 Matthew Lewis, Frank Aiken's War: The Irish Revolution, 1916-23 (2014)
 Bryce and Kelly, Frank Aiken: Nationalist and Internationalist (2014)

External links
Frank Aiken Papers, Archives Department, University College Dublin 
Press Photographs from the Papers of Frank Aiken (1898–1983) A UCD Digital Library Collection.

1898 births
1983 deaths
People from County Armagh
Ministers for Finance (Ireland)
Ministers for Foreign Affairs (Ireland)
Fianna Fáil TDs
Knights Grand Cross of the Order of Pope Pius IX
Irish Republican Army (1919–1922) members
Irish Republican Army (1922–1969) members
People of the Irish Civil War (Anti-Treaty side)
Tánaistí
Members of the 4th Dáil
Members of the 5th Dáil
Members of the 6th Dáil
Members of the 7th Dáil
Members of the 8th Dáil
Members of the 9th Dáil
Members of the 10th Dáil
Members of the 11th Dáil
Members of the 12th Dáil
Members of the 13th Dáil
Members of the 14th Dáil
Members of the 15th Dáil
Members of the 16th Dáil
Members of the 17th Dáil
Members of the 18th Dáil
Members of the 19th Dáil
Early Sinn Féin politicians
Presidential appointees to the Council of State (Ireland)
20th-century Irish farmers
People educated at Abbey Christian Brothers' Grammar School
People educated at St Colman's College, Newry
Ministers for Defence (Ireland)
Ministers for Agriculture (Ireland)
Sandyford